Chvala is a Czech surname. Notable people with the surname include:

 Chuck Chvala (born 1954), American businessman and politician
 Emanuel Chvála (1851–1924), Czech composer and music critic
 Milan Chvála, Czech entomologist

Czech-language surnames